Panetolikos Football Club, or with its full name Panetolikós Yimnastikós Filekpedeftikós Síllogos (Pan-Aetolian Gymnastic and Educational Club), is a Greek professional football club. It was based in Agrinio, Greece. Panetolikos was founded in 1926 and is considered one of the historical clubs in Greece, currently participating in the Greek First Division. Some of the most well known players that started their career in the club are Stratos Apostolakis, former Greek recordman in international caps (96), and Petros Michos.

Team colors are yellow and blue. The club's symbol is Titormus, the ancient Aetolian hero and their motto is "Τίτορμος Αιτωλός Ούτος Άλλος Ηρακλής" (Títormos Etolós Oútos Állos Iraklís), translated as Titormus the Aetolian is another Heracles.

History

Formation and early years
Panetolikos was founded on Tuesday March 9, 1926 with the purpose, as stated in its statutes: "The development and intensification of Gymnastic and Racing, The -ETHIC- supervision and the possible after-school education of minors, through childhood and EASTERN or Sunday schools".
People had the idea of creating the club they did the act: "Healthy mind in a healthy body". The unprecedented thought and goal of the founders, to provide education to the needy children through its Night Schools, added in its title the word "Educational Educator" and became an example to imitate all the Associations in Greece. Beyond sports, his social offer was enormous in very difficult times. Hundreds of poor children learned letters at Night Schools that worked and cared for themselves in society. This athletico-social organization has written glory pages for Agrinio. Sections of classic sports, volleyball, basketball, shooting, etc. were created although its football team was the one loved by Aetolians and Akarnans.

In the season 1954–55, Panetolikos participated for the first time in his history at the Pan-Hellenic Championship, as the club finished in the first position of the southern group of the regional championship as one of the six teams that took part in his final stage. In the 1960s, Panetolikos played in the Second National Championship and after relegation to the local (1972), he returned dynamically. In the spring of 1975 celebrates the rise to Alpha Ethniki. Panetolikos fought two seasons (1975–1977) and followed an unsuccessful return attempt. It followed for about twenty years where it was in the smallest category to return to the period 1975–76. In the first class, Panetolikos remained in the following year (1976–77), but then returned to the lower classes where the club remained for more than 30 years. Seven years later, Panetolikos was relegated from the 2nd and in the period 1984–85, Panetolikos conquered the championship of Gamma Ethniki.

Panetolikos winning Delta Ethniki's championship in 1989, Gamma Ethniki's championship in 1992 and 1996, and one year after Panetolikos touches the dream of returning to Alpha Ethniki, which the powerful of the season deprives him. The new millennium finds him on a downward course and is relegated to Delta Ethniki.

Kostoulas era
In the summer of 2005, the new Greek owner Fotis Kostoulas, coming from Sweden and wanting to take the reins of the city team from which he came, presented his plans for the future of the club and followed a radical refurbishment of the stadium.
More specifically, the following projects were completed by the end of 2006: new turf, construction of a shelter above the western pit, renovation of the interior (changing rooms, cafe-bar, clubs, boutique shops), construction of new newspapers and suites, On the two platforms, regeneration of the surrounding area. In addition, in 2009, a new roofed frieze was built with a capacity of about 120 distinct seats above the small east stand.

2008–09 Season: Promotion to Second Division
Panetolikos won an epic play-offs tie against fellow third-tier side Rodos to win promotion to the Beta Ethniki for the 2009–10 season. The tie was played in Athens at the Nea Smyrni Stadium, in front of full house, with 8,000 loyal fans traveling from Agrinio to support the team. After going down 1–0 early, the team staged an impressive fight back to win the game 2–1 with two goals in the last 5 minutes. Scenes of joy followed as one of the better-supported teams in rural Greece won promotion. Now in the Football League, Panetolikos continue to get terrific support, both home and away.

2010–11 Season: Promotion to the Super League
After terrific performances inside and outside Agrinio, Panetolikos won the last three critical matches (Ethnikos-Panetolikos 0–1, Panetolikos-Diagoras Rodou 3–0 and Ilioupoli-Panetolikos 2–3) and promoted to Super League. The team's 2010 performances have set new records for the Football League championship: point record (75 gathered after 34 games), away wins record (10 wins out of 23 total). Panetolikos had celebrated their promotion at home with a Friendly match against Panionios, a Super League team, on 20 May 2011.

2011–12 Season: Demotion to the Football League
After a very bad second round of results at the Super League, Panetolikos demoted to the Football League. The chairman of the club, Mr. Kostoulas after seven years, resigned from his position. After this, the whole board resigned. Most of the players left the club, said that they wanted to return to their countries, or they want to play for other teams with better contracts.

2012–13 Season: Promotion to the Super League
With Mr. Kostoulas again as a president, Panetolikos got promoted to the Super League via play-offs after six difficult games, especially the last one with Olympiacos Volos, which Panetolikos won 1–2. After the end of the game, the city of Agrinio celebrated the promotion until dawn.

2013–14 & 2014–15 Seasons
The team had its most successful year so far in the First Division, finishing in the 8th place. In 2014–15 season, form of the team improved and finished First Division as 7th.

2015–16 & 2016–17 Seasons
Panetolikos finished in the 11th place in 2016 as well as in 2017.

2017–18 Season
The team finished at 8th place with good performances.

Stadium 

Panetolikos Stadium (Greek: Γήπεδο Παναιτωλικού -Gipedo Panetolikou) is a football stadium in Agrinio, Greece. It is currently used for football matches, mainly as the home stadium of Panetolikos. It is located at Prousiotissis Street and it holds 7,500 people. Its highest attendance was 11,012 people during a match against Olympiacos in 1977. There are plans to increase the seating capacity of the stadium to 8,800 spectators. Nowadays the average attendance is 6,000.

Panetolikos Stadium has three stands. It has been used as a football ground since 1930, however, the first stand (the small one) was not constructed until the mid-1950s. The main west stand was built in the 1970s. Unfortunately, in the years that followed little else happened to the stadium, which gradually fell into disrepair. This was the situation until 2005, when the new owner of the club, Fotis Kostoulas, revealed his plans for the complete reconstruction of the stadium.

Stadium Situation: 2006–2011

The stadium features plastic seats, the club's offices, Panetolikos' boutique and coffee shops.

2006: The big stand was completely renovated, a brand new stand with a modern roof.

2010: The small stand was renovated, in the center a second level of seats with a roof was added.

2011: Works have begun after the promotion of the team to Super League in order to increase the capacity of the stadium by 1,400 seats approximately. Plus, additional lighting was added. Recently the lighting has finished, with the power of each light at 1,600 lux, which more than satisfies the Greek Super League and UEFA's 4 stars (where a team can play UEFA Champions League games) requirements.

2017: Scoreboard is added, completing the current renovation plans.

2019: Recently the Region of Western Greece has approved plans of further upgrade of the stadium, with the adding of exhibition centers, new seating
stands and many other features.

Facilities
Panetolikos' training center, named "Emileon", in Municipal Apartment of Dokimi, Agrinio. Emileon, the training center that escapes from Greek standards and is approaching the European. Α real jewel, not only for the "canaries", but also for Greek sports as a whole. A jewel made by the president of Panetolikos, Fotis Kostoulas. Soccer fields, swimming pools, courts, tennis, basketball and beach volleyball create a unique place. A place that is enjoyed not only by the football players, but also by the citizens of Agrinio.

Supporters
Even though Agrinio is a small city, Panetolikos supporters known as "The Warriors" & "Guerreros" are known for their loyalty to their team. Supporters can roughly be categorized to Gate 6 which represents the most radical and young part of the team's fanbase and other fan unions which attract less radical and older Panetolikos fans. First division promotion has set in motion more Panetolikos fan clubs in Aetoloakarnania and northern Greece (Thessaloniki). Up until now, the prestigious fan clubs of the team are:

Gate 6
 1. Warriors (Fan club in Agrinio, since 1981)
 2. Guerreros (Fan club in Athens)
 3. Brooklyn (Fan club in Agrinio, area of St. Demetrius)
Other fan clubs
 4. LE.FI.PA. (Club of Panetolikos Fans in Agrinio)
 5. S.F.P (Club of Panetolikos Supporters in Agrinio)

Nicknames
Panetolikos was given the nickname The Canaries (Greek: Τα καναρίνια) in the 1960s, due to the team's colour. Panetolikos is very proud of its nickname, thus its mascot is a canary with the name PANETOS.

Panetolikos was also given the nickname Titormus, from the ancient hero.

21st century league performances

Honours

National (7)
Football League (Second Division)
Championships (2): 1974–75, 2010–11
Gamma Ethniki (Third Division)
Championships (3): 1984–85, 1991–92, 1995–96
Delta Ethniki (Fourth Division)
Championships (2): 1988–89, 2003―04

Regional (2)
Mainland Greece Championship
Championship (1): 1955
Youth Team, South Greece championship, 2nd and 3rd National Division
Championship (1): 2007

Crest and colours
Panetolikos crest depicts Titormus, the ancient hero of Aetolia. The club's motto (also depicted on the crest) is Τίτορμος Αιτωλός Ούτος Άλλος Ηρακλής, translated as Titormus the Aetolian is another Heracles. The colours of the team are yellow and blue or cyan.

Crest evolution

Kit manufacturers and shirt sponsors

Current sponsorships:
Great Shirt Sponsor: Shopflix
Official Sport Clothing Manufacturer: Givova
Golden Sponsor: Interwetten

Players

Current squad

Out on loan

Club staff

League performances

Point system: 1959–60 to 1972–73: 3–2–1. 1973–74 to 1991–92: 2–1–0. 1992–93 onwards: 3–1–0.

League Participation

Super League Greece (11): 1975–1977, 2011–2012, 2013–present
Football League (30): 1962–1972, 1973–1975, 1977–1984, 1985–1987, 1992–1993, 1996–2001, 2009–2011, 2012–2013
Gamma Ethniki (15): 1972–1973, 1984–1985, 1987–1988, 1989–1992, 1993–1996, 2001–2002, 2004–2009
Delta Ethniki (3): 1988–1989, 2002–2004

Notable former players

Albania
 Pavli Vangjeli
 Mario Gurma
 Simon Rrumbullaku
 Redon Bryshlli
 Aurel Demo
 Roni Karai
 Enea Mihaj
 Kristo Koka
 Angelo Muka
 Jurgen Lleshi
 Fialbi Lleshi
Algeria
 Raïs M'Bolhi
 Aymen Tahar
Argentina
 Daniel Roberto Gil
 Lucas de Francesco
 Bruno Martelotto
 Lucas Favalli
 Fernando Godoy
 Nicolás Martínez
 Mauro Poy
 Sebastian Rusculleda
 Lucas Villafáñez
 Emiliano Romero
 Osmar Ferreyra
 Emmanuel Ledesma
 Fabian Muñoz
 Federico Bravo
 Kevin Itabel
 Franco Mazurek
 Nicolás Maná
 Adrián Lucero
 Luciano Balbi
 Juan Álvarez
 Javier Mendoza
 Nicolás Mazzola
 Elías Pereyra
 Joaquín Arzura
 Braian Lluy
 Diego Rodríguez
Australia
 Michael Valkanis
Austria
 Christopher Knett
Belarus
 Vadim Narushevich
 Maksim Shcherbin
 Illya Aleksiyevich
Belgium
 Wouter Corstjens
 Patrick Dimbala
Benin
 Rudy Gestede
Bolivia
 Diego Bejarano
 Danny Bejarano
Bosnia and Herzegovina
 Simo Krunić
 Emir Hadžić
 Branislav Nikić
 Edin Cocalić
Brazil
 Fabricio Rogerio
 Rodriguez Ademar
 Giovanni Pedrini
 Luiz Carlos Dacroce
 André Rocha
 Júnior
 Rafael Bracalli
 Rodrigo Galo
 André Alves
 Marcos Paulo
 Farley Vieira Rosa
 Diego Lopes
 Arghus
 Willyan
 Vanderson
Bulgaria
 Efremov
 Vlatko Kolev
 Stanislav Stoyanov
 Hristo Yanev
 Giorgos Manthatis
Burkina Faso
 Habib Bamogo
Cameroon
 André Bikey
 Olivier Boumale
 Valéry Mézague
Canada
 John Limniatis
 Derek Cornelius
Colombia
 Erik Moreno
 Luis Mosquera
Congo
 Delvin N'Dinga
Croatia
 Saša Jelovac
 Mario Budimir
 Igor Jovanović
 Antonio Jakoliš
 Branko Vrgoč
DR Congo
 Wilson Kamavuaka
Egypt
 Amr Warda
England
 Michalis Banias
 Jason Blunt
 Febian Brandy
 Javan Vidal
France
 William Edjenguélé
 Cyril Kali
 Florent Hanin
 Wilfried Dalmat
 Anthony Scaramozzino
 Johan Martial
 Anthony Mounier
 Fabien Antunes

Gambia
 Cherno Samba
Georgia
 Giorgi Kikava
 Georgi Kipiani
 Levan Shengelia
Germany
 Daniel Gunkel
 Stefanos Papoutsogiannopoulos
 Christos Agrodimos
 Stacy-Edis Gyan-Boatey
Ghana
 David Addy
Greece
 Giannis Anestis
 Kostas Apostolakis
 Stratos Apostolakis
 Michalis Bakakis
 Makis Bakadimas
 Giorgos Barkoglou
 Christos Belevonis
 Makis Belevonis
 Stathis Belevonis
 Michalis Boukouvalas
 Giannis Bouzoukis
 Dimitris Chantakias
 Angelos Charisteas
 Ilias Chatzitheodoridis
 Diamantis Chouchoumis
 Christos Dimopoulos
 Filippos Darlas
 Tasos Dentsas
 Elini Dimoutsos
 Giorgos Fotakis
 Dimitris Fytopoulos
 Nikos Giannakopoulos
 Vasilis Golias
 Ilias Gianniotis
 Vaggelis Kaounos
 Nikos Karelis
 Aristotelis Karasalidis
 Alexandros Kavvadias
 Zacharias Kavousakis
 Dimitris Kolovos
 Andreas Kolovouris
 Apostolos Konstantopoulos
 Georgios Kousas
 Dimitris Koutromanos
 Dimitris Kyriakidis
 Giorgos Liavas
 Alexandros Malis
 Grigoris Makos
 Stelios Malezas
 Nikos Marinakis
 Nikos Melissas
 Paschalis Melissas
 Petros Michos
 Vangelis Moras
 Hussein Mumin
 Giorgos Mygas
 Thanasis Paleologos
 Tasos Papazoglou
 Alexandros Parras
 Giannis Pasas
 Giorgos Poniros
 Georgios Simos
 Stelios Sfakianakis
 Giorgos Smiltos
 Manolis Stefanakos
 Antonis Stergiakis
 Giannis Takidis
 Giorgos Theodoridis
 Dionysis Tsamis
 Angelos Tsingaras
 Tasos Tsokanis
 Manolis Tzanakakis
 Stathis Vasiloudis
 Stylianos Vasileiou
 Nikos Vergos
 Alexandros Voilis
 Giorgos Xenitidis
 Alexandros Zeris
 Panagiotis Zorbas
 Petros Zouroudis
Honduras
 Deybi Flores
Hungary
 Tibor Szabó
Iran
 Mohammad Reza Azadi
Italy
 Luigi Cennamo
 Giuseppe Aquaro
 Ivan Varone
Ivory Coast
 Kanga Akalé
 Marc-Éric Gueï
 Nadrey Dago
Jordan
 Christos Alobisat
Liberia
 George Gebro
 Dulee Johnson
Mexico
 Paolo Medina
Montenegro
 Nemanja Vuković
 Davor Jakovljević
 Srđan Blažić
Morocco
 Jamal Achannah
Mozambique
 Manuel Lopes
 Clésio
Netherlands
 Leandro Kappel
Nigeria
 Benjamin Onwuachi
 Abiola Dauda
 Afeez Nosiru
Norway
 Jarl André Storbæk

 Palestine
 Saado Abdel Salam Fouflia
Paraguay
 José Barreto
Peru
 Carlos Ascues
Poland
 Fabian Pawela
 Jacek Kacprzak
Portugal
 Israel 
 Ivo Afonso
 Chiquinho
 Ricardo Fernandes
 Cristiano
 Tomané
 Miguel Rodrigues
 Luís Rocha
 Pedro Amaral
 Guga
 Frederico Duarte
 Dálcio
 Mimito
 Hélder Barbosa
 João Pedro
Romania
 Emanuel Patrascu
 Florin Pripu
 Costin Lazăr
 Vlad Morar
 Sebastian Mladen
Senegal
 Samba Diarra
 Samba Sow
 Henri Camara
 Pierre Sagna
Serbia
 Mihajlo Simeunović
 Vladimir Jovanović
 Zoran Stoinović
 Boban Stojanović
 Vladimir Bogdanović
 Pavle Popara
 Dušan Jovanović
 Željko Simović
 Ljubiša Milojević
 Milan Bojović
 Luka Vucicević
 Slobodan Miletić
 Marko Markovski
 Nikola Stajić
Sierra Leone
 Alhassan Kamara
 Jonathan Morsay
Slovakia
 Mouhamadou Seye
 Peter Doležaj
Slovenia
 Gregor Režonja
 Dejan Božicić
 Žiga Kljajič
 Mitja Mörec
 Mirnes Šišić
Spain
 Kevin Ulbrich
 Kevin
 Álvaro Rey
 Joan Román
 Jesús Fernández
Sweden
 Johan Wallinder
 Jonas Bylund
 Jonas Forsberg
 Demba Traoré
 Jonas Pelgander
 Sebastian Eriksson
 Admir Bajrovic
 Rasmus Sjöstedt
 Johan Mårtensson
 Jacob Une Larsson
Switzerland 
 Damian Bellón
Turkey
 Deniz Baykara
United States
 Ahinga Selemani
 Gboly Ariyibi
Uruguay
 Jorge Díaz
Uzbekistan
 Dimitris Papadopoulos
Venezuela
 Juanpi
 Joel Graterol

Managerial history

  Nikos Anastopoulos (2000–01)
  Panikos Georgiou (2001)
  Dragan Simeunović (2004)
  Vasilis Xanthopoulos (2004–05)
  Stathis Stathopoulos (2005–06)
  Lysandros Georgamlis (2006–07)
  Vasilis Dalaperas (2007)
  Myron Sifakis (July 1, 2007 – June 30, 2008)
  Christos Vasiliou (2008)
  Vasilis Dalaperas (2008)
  Spyros Marangos  (2008)
  Vasilis Xanthopoulos (2008)
  Nikos Kehagias (July 1, 2008 – June 30, 2009)
  Vasilis Dalaperas (2009)
  Siniša Gogić (July 1, 2009 – Jan 20, 2010)
  Giannis Dalakouras (Jan 19, 2010 – Jan 6, 2011)
  Babis Tennes (Jan 6, 2011 – Feb 9, 2012)
  Takis Lemonis (Feb 9, 2012 – April 11, 2012)
  Giannis Dalakouras (April 12, 2012 – June 30, 2012)
  Nikos Karageorgiou (July 3, 2012 – Jan 23, 2013)
  Makis Chavos (Jan 23, 2013 – May 18, 2015)
  Leonel Pontes (June 9, 2015 – Sept 28, 2015)
  Giannis Matzourakis (Oct 8, 2015 – Jan 17, 2017)
  Makis Chavos (Jan 19, 2017 – Jan 7, 2018)
  Traianos Dellas (Jan 11, 2018 – April 19, 2019)
  Luís Castro (May 30, 2019 – Oct 11, 2019)
  Makis Chavos (Oct 16, 2019 – Oct 28, 2020)
  Luciano (Oct 28, 2020 – Nov 10, 2020)
  Traianos Dellas (Nov 10, 2020 – Jun 5, 2021)
  Giannis Anastasiou (Jun 10, 2021 – Present)

See also
 Aetoloacarnania Football Clubs Association

References

External links

Official websites
 Official website 
 Panetolikos at Super League 
 Panetolikos at UEFA
 Panetolikos at FIFA
News sites
 Panetolikos on agriniopress.gr 
 Panetolikos news from Nova Sports
Other
 Emileon official website
Media
 Official YouTube channel

 
Association football clubs established in 1926
Football clubs in Western Greece
1926 establishments in Greece
Agrinio
Multi-sport clubs in Greece